Nephele accentifera, the accented hawk, is a moth of the family Sphingidae. The species was first described by Palisot de Beauvois in 1821. It is common in most habitats throughout the Ethiopian Region, excluding Madagascar and the Cape Peninsula.

Diet
The larvae feed on the leaves of Ficus sur and Ficus natalensis.

References

Nephele (moth)
Moths described in 1821
Moths of Africa
Moths of the Comoros
Moths of São Tomé and Príncipe